Riverside Radio is a local digital radio station based in Battersea, London, which broadcasts local news, sports, music and specialist shows.  It can be listened to via its website https://www.riversideradio.com/.  Its main audience is based in South West London.

Launch
In July 2014, a Crowdfunding campaign was launched with the aim of raising £3,000 for studio equipment and software. The station went live on 12 January 2015, the station went live  with Martin Harris and Samantha Baines presenting the live launch show. The station was officially opened by Mayor of Wandsworth, Cllr Stuart Thom. Since launching Wandsworth Radio, the station has become an important feature in the local community and the outside broadcast team will often be present at local events such as the switching on of the Christmas lights or summer street festivals across the borough. The station launched a project to celebrate the diversity of Wandsworth by highlighting residents who were born outside of the UK to mark the first anniversary broadcasting.

Other Information
In October 2016 Wandsworth Radio applied to the regulator Ofcom for a community radio licence to broadcast on an FM bandwidth across the borough. In 2017 Ofcom turned down the application because they could not find a suitable FM frequency. In August 2017 Wandsworth Radio opened new purpose built studios at the Doddington and Rollo Business Centre in Battersea. On September 15, 2018 Wandsworth Radio was crowned the Digital/RSL Station of the Year by Community Radio Awards in Sheffield. On April 7, 2019, the station re-branded as Riverside Radio to serve the boroughs of Wandsworth, Lambeth, Merton and Richmond with the slogan 'Switch on SW London'.

Presenters 
Dean McCullough formerly presented on Wandsworth Radio.

References

Radio stations in London